There have been two rail crashes near Welwyn Garden City railway station in Hertfordshire, England, one in 1935 and another less serious accident in 1957.

1935 crash

On 15 June 1935, a train from London King's Cross to Leeds collided with a train from Kings Cross to Newcastle at night. Fourteen people were killed and 29 injured.

The accident was a rear collision caused by a signalman's error. The signalman at Welwyn Garden City, who had been fairly recently appointed to the box, became confused and accepted a second train into a block section that was already occupied. The Newcastle train, arriving first, received a signal check and was slowed to 15‒20 mph; the Leeds train consisting of 11 coaches hauled by Class K3 2-6-0 No 4009 ran into it at approximately 65 mph.

There were several significant features. Firstly, the modern rolling stock with buckeye couplings withstood the violent collision well, apart from the last coach which was totally destroyed; older coaches would have been crushed, with much heavier loss of life. Secondly, the Inspecting Officer felt that the signalman had been promoted beyond his level of competence for such a busy box, and the assessment and training procedures for signalmen should be improved. Different commentators have disagreed on this; Rolt and Hamilton supported the Inspector, Vaughan felt the signalman had had insufficient time to become fully experienced in working the box. Thirdly, the Inspector recommended that the block instruments should be linked to the track circuits to prevent future occurrences in such a way that a "Line clear" indication could only be given on the block instrument if the track circuits had registered passage of a train; this was widely adopted and known as Welwyn Control.

1957 crash

A second accident took place here on 7 January 1957; and was another rear collision, but with a completely different cause. This occurred at dawn about half a mile south of the station, and was due to the driver of an Aberdeen to London express passing signals at danger in mist, and not hearing the explosion of emergency detonators as his locomotive ran over them.

The express was travelling at around 60‒65 mph when it collided with the rear of a local train, which had just pulled away from the station and was travelling at around 30‒35 mph. The rear coach of the local train was wrecked in the collision and two more were overturned. One passenger in the local train was killed and 25 injured. The locomotive of the express overturned and the driver suffered severe shock.

See also 
 Lists of rail accidents

References

External links
 Railways Archive summary and link to accident report for 1935 collision
 Official Railways Inspectorate accident report for 1935 collision
 Railways Archive summary and official accident report for 1957 collision
 Official Railways Inspectorate accident report for 1957 collision

Railway accidents and incidents in Hertfordshire
History of Hertfordshire
20th century in Hertfordshire
Train collisions in England
1935 disasters in the United Kingdom
1957 disasters in the United Kingdom